This is an index of articles about the Church of Jesus Christ of Latter-day Saints.

0–9
 1890 Manifesto
 1978 Revelation on Priesthood

A
 Aaronic priesthood
 Acting President of the Quorum of the Twelve Apostles
 Adam and Eve
 Adam-ondi-Ahman
 Adamic language
 Affirmation: LGBTQ Mormons, Families, & Friends
 Age of accountability
 Agency
 Angels
 Anointing
 Anointing of the sick
 Apostle
 Apostolic succession
 Area
 Art
 Articles of Faith
 Assistant to the Twelve
 Authority and Mormonism
 Auxiliary organization

B
 Baptism
 Baptism for the dead
 Baptismal clothing
 Beliefs and practices of the Church
 Bible (LDS edition)
 Bible Dictionary
 Birth control and the Church
 Bishop
 Bishop's storehouse
 Black people and Mormonism
 Black people and priesthood
 Blogosphere
 Blood atonement
 Book of Abraham
 Book of Commandments
 Book of Mormon
 Book of Mormon musical
 Book of Moses
 Branch
 Branch president
 Brass plates
 Brigham Young University
 Brigham Young University–Hawaii
 Brigham Young University–Idaho
 Brigham Young University LGBT history

C
 Calling
 Celestial kingdom
 Celestial marriage
 The Children's Friend
 Children's Songbook
 Choose the right
 Christianity and Mormonism
 Church Administration Building
 Church Educational System
 Church Historian and Recorder
 Church History Department
 Church History Library
 Church History Museum
 Church News
 Church Office Building
 Cinema
 Clergy
 Common consent
 Conference Center
 Confession
 Confirmation
 Continuous revelation
 Correlation Program
 Cosmology
 Council on the Disposition of the Tithes
 Covenant
 Criticism of the Church
 Culture of the Church
 Cumorah

D
 Danite
 Deacon
 Degrees of glory
 Deseret
 Deseret Industries
 Direct revelation
 Disciplinary council
 Dispensation
 Dispensation of the fulness of times
 District
 Doctrine and Covenants

E
 Elder
 Elohim
 Endowment
 Ensign
 Eternal life
 Evangelist
 Evolution
 Exaltation
 Excommunication
 Exmormon Foundation

F
 The Family: A Proclamation to the World
 Family History Center
 Family History Library
 Family Home Evening
 FamilySearch
 Family Services
 Fast offering
 Fast Sunday
 Fiction
 Finances of the Church
 Fireside
 First Presidency
 First Presidency's Christmas Devotional
 First Vision
 Folklore
 For the Strength of Youth
 Foreordination
 Freemasonry and Mormonism
 The Friend

G
 Garment
 Gathering
 Gender minorities and the Church
 General authority
 General Conference
 Gifts of the Spirit
 God
 Golden plates
 Good Neighbor policy
 Gospel Principles
 Great and abominable church
 Great Apostasy

H
 Handbook
 Handcart pioneers
 High council
 High priest
 History of the Church
 Holy of Holies
 Home teaching
 Homosexuality and the Church
 House of Joseph
 Hymns
 Hymns (1985 book)

I
 Improvement Era
 Indian Placement Program
 Institute of Religion
 Interracial marriage and the Church
 The Instructor
 Islam and Mormonism

J
 Jehovah
 Joseph Smith
 Joseph Smith–History
 Joseph Smith–Matthew
 Joseph Smith Memorial Building
 Joseph Smith Translation of the Bible
 Journal of Discourses
 Judaism and Mormonism
 Juvenile Instructor

K
 Kolob

L
 Lamanite
 Law of chastity
 Law of consecration
 Laying on of hands
 LDS Business College
 LDS Humanitarian Services
 LGBT Brigham Young University history
 LGBT Mormon history
 LGBT Mormon people and organizations
 LGBT rights and the Church
 LGBT Mormon suicides
 Liahona
 Liahona (magazine)
 Light of Christ
 Literature
 The Living Christ: The Testimony of the Apostles

M
 Manifesto of 1890
 Manifesto of 1904 (Second Manifesto)
 Marriage
 Martyrdom of Joseph Smith
 Masturbation and the Church
 Melchizedek priesthood
 Membership history
 Membership statistics
 Membership statistics (Canada)
 Membership statistics (United States)
 Millennial Star
 Ministering
 Mission
 Mission president
 Missionary
 Missionary Training Center
 Mormon (Book of Mormon prophet)
 Mormon (word)
 Mormon Battalion
 Mormon colonies in Mexico
 Mormon Corridor
 Mormon Tabernacle Choir
 Mormon Trail
 Mormonism
 Mormons
 Moroni (angel)
 Moroni (Book of Mormon prophet)
 Mother in Heaven
 Heavenly Parents
 Mountain Meadows Massacre
 Music
 Music & the Spoken Word

N
 Name of the Church
 Naming and blessing of children
 Native American people and Mormonism
 Nephites
 New Era
 New Jerusalem

O
 One true church
 Orchestra at Temple Square
 Ordinance
 Ordinance room
 Ordination
 Outer darkness

P
 Patriarch
 Patriarchal blessing
 Pearl of Great Price
 Personal Ancestral File
 Philanthropies
 Phrenology and the Latter Day Saint movement
 Pioneer Day
 Pioneers
 Plan of salvation
 Plural marriage
 Poetry
 Politics in the United States and the Church
 Prayer
 Prayer circle
 Pre-existence
 President (honorific)
 President of the Church
 President of the Quorum of the Twelve Apostles
 Presiding Bishop
 Presiding Patriarch
 Priest
 Priesthood
 Priesthood blessing
 Primary
 Prophet, seer, and revelator
 Public relations of the Church

Q
 Quorum
 Quorum of the Twelve Apostles

R
 Reformed Egyptian
 Regional representative of the Twelve
 Relief Society
 Relief Society Magazine
 Reorganized Church of Jesus Christ of Latter Day Saints
 Restoration
 Revelation
 Revelation on Priesthood

S
 Sacrament
 Sacrament meeting
 Sacred Grove
 Saints
 Salt Lake Assembly Hall
 Salt Lake Tabernacle
 Salt Lake Temple
 Sealing
 Sealing power
 Second anointing
 Second Coming
 Second Manifesto
 Secret combination
 Seer stone
 Seminaries
 Setting apart
 Seventy
 Sexual orientation change efforts and the Church
 Sexuality and Mormonism
 Single adult
 Soaking
 Solemn assembly
 Son of perdition
 Spirit body
 Spirit world
 Stake
 Standard works
 Suicide and the Church
 Sunday School

T
 Teacher
 Teachings of Presidents of the Church
 Telestial kingdom
 Temple
 Temple architecture
 Temple president
 Temple Square
 Ten Lost Tribes
 Terrestrial kingdom
 Three Nephites
 Tithing
 Translation
 Tree of life vision

U
 United Order
 Universalism and the Latter Day Saint movement
 Urim and Thummim

V
 Violence and Mormonism
 Visiting teaching

W
 War in Heaven
 Ward
 Washing and anointing
 Welfare Square
 Women and Mormonism
 Word of Wisdom
 Worship services of the Church

X

Y
 Young Men
 Young Women

Z
 Zion

See also

 Encyclopedia of Mormonism

Church of Jesus Christ of Latter-day Saints